The Right of the Unborn (German: Das Recht der Ungeborenen) is a 1929 German silent drama film directed by Adolf Trotz and starring Maly Delschaft, Elizza La Porta and Hans Adalbert Schlettow. The film is in the Weimar tradition of Enlightenment films. It examines the question of abortion of unborn children. Unlike several other German films of the era, it is generally anti-abortion. It was shot at the Halensee Studios in Berlin. The film's art direction is by Hans Jacoby.

Cast
 Maly Delschaft as Elsa Lohrmann
 Elizza La Porta as Elli
 Hans Adalbert Schlettow as Rolf Stürmer
 Wolfgang Zilzer as Fredy
 Fritz Kampers as Peter Mahler
 Iwa Wanja as Anni, Fredys Freundin
 Robby Roberts as Fritzchen
 Curt Cappi as Frauenarzt Dr. Wehner
 Eva Speyer

References

Bibliography
 Prawer, S.S. Between Two Worlds: The Jewish Presence in German and Austrian Film, 1910–1933. Berghahn Books, 2005.

External links

1929 films
Films of the Weimar Republic
German silent feature films
German drama films
Films directed by Adolf Trotz
1929 drama films
Films about abortion
German black-and-white films
Silent drama films
Films shot at Halensee Studios
1920s German films